The Price of Redemption is a lost 1920 American silent crime film directed by Dallas M. Fitzgerald and starring Bert Lytell, Seena Owen and Cleo Madison.

Cast
 Bert Lytell as Leigh Dering 
 Seena Owen as Jean Dering 
 Cleo Madison as Anne Steel 
 Landers Stevens as Richard Willoughby 
 Edward Cecil as Govind Singh, the Rajah 
 Arthur Morrison as Colonel Desmond 
 Wilbur Higby as Colonel Dering 
 Michael D. Moore as Billy 
 Rose Marie de Courelle as Ayah

References

Bibliography
 Monaco, James. The Encyclopedia of Film. Perigee Books, 1991.

External links

lantern slide (Wayback Machine)

1920 films
1920 drama films
1920s English-language films
American silent feature films
Silent American drama films
Films directed by Dallas M. Fitzgerald
American black-and-white films
Metro Pictures films
Films based on works by I. A. R. Wylie
Lost American films
1920 lost films
Lost drama films
1920s American films